David Hoadley Thorne (born September 16, 1944) is an American businessman and diplomat who served as United States Ambassador to Italy and Ambassador to San Marino from 2009 to 2013. He was nominated by President Barack Obama and sworn in on August 17, 2009.

David Thorne's parents were Alice Smith (Barry) and Landon Ketchum Thorne Jr. David lived in Italy for a decade while his father helped administer the Marshall Plan. David's twin sister Julia was the first wife of John Kerry. Thorne graduated from Yale University in 1966 with a B.A. in American History, where he roomed with Kerry and both were members of Skull and Bones, and then from Columbia University in 1971 with a master's degree in journalism. He served in the United States Navy during the Vietnam War, and worked in political consulting, real estate development, and publishing. He is married and has two grown children.

Honours and decorations
   Knight Grand Cross of the Order of Merit of the Italian Republic on March 26, 2013

References

External links

|-

1944 births
Ambassadors of the United States to Italy
Ambassadors of the United States to San Marino
Businesspeople from Massachusetts
Living people
American twins
Yale College alumni
21st-century American diplomats